Lumut Port is located off the Straits of Malacca, on the west coast of Peninsular Malaysia, in Perak.

History and description 
Lumut Port known as Lumut Maritime Terminal Sdn Bhd, it owns and operates the port at Kg Acheh, Lumut which was officiated on 24 July 1995 and have been in operation for more than 20 years. In 2002, Lumut Port began to operate and manage Lekir Bulk Terminal.

Lumut Port Industrial Park provides land space for warehousing or transhipment and is on offer for local and foreign investors who are able to contribute to the throughput of the Port.

Types of cargo handled 
 Break bulk consists of hydrated lime, quicklime, OPC, white cement, project cargo
 Dry bulk consists of limestone, coal, petroleum coke, PKE, salt, aggregates, clay
 Liquid bulk consists of palm oil products, petroleum products, acid products

Buildings and structures in Perak
Ports and harbours of Malaysia
Transport in Perak